Vicki Myron (born 1947) is an American author and librarian. Director of the Spencer Public Library for more than 20 years, Myron is best known for her book Dewey: The Small-Town Library Cat Who Touched the World, written with Bret Witter. It sold more than one million copies internationally and was on bestseller lists for more than six months. It is about a cat which she found and cared for at the library, and his engaging effects on the townspeople. The library cat's story became internationally known before his death.

The book's great success led to a publishing phenomenon, with Myron and Witter also writing two related children's books, and with publication of audio books. Their sequel, Dewey's Nine Lives, was published in 2010 as was a second children's picture book about the cat. A proposed film adaptation has not been completed; as of May 2012 the script had not been approved and the first option was due to expire in June 2012.

Early life
Vicki Myron was born in Spencer, Iowa and grew up on a farm near Moneta, fifteen miles from the town of Spencer. Myron attended local schools and graduated from high school in Hartley. She earned her bachelor's degree at Minnesota State University, Mankato, then called Mankato State University in Minnesota. There she also married and had a daughter. Later she moved to Emporia, Kansas, where she completed a master's degree at Emporia State University.

Myron had health problems to deal with while doing graduate study. She and her husband divorced because of his alcoholism (as she discussed in her 2008 book). She raised their daughter as a single mother.

Career
Myron returned to Spencer and started working in its public library in 1982. She served as the head librarian of the Spencer library for 25 years. She retired in 2007 and lives in Spencer, Iowa as of December 2008 with her cat Page who was given to Myron by her friend who found the cat on a snow-covered road.

In 1988, Myron found an 8-week-old kitten left in the library drop box on a bitterly cold night. She took care of him, naming him Dewey. (His full name was Dewey Readmore Books.) The staff made him the library cat. He lived until 2006, making friends with many library patrons and becoming internationally famous after his story was reported in various outlets. His obituary was carried by 250 newspapers, including the New York Times.

Myron retired from the library the next year, and began work on a book about Dewey, with co-author Bret Witter. They were delighted to receive $1.2 million from Grand Central Publishing for the rights to Dewey's life story. The pair wrote Dewey: The Small-Town Library Cat Who Touched the World , which was published in 2008. The book recounted the story of the cat, which had reached an international audience, and reflected on her own and the town's challenges during this period. It became a great success. It sold more than a million copies internationally, was translated into numerous languages, and was on bestseller lists for six months.

In November 2008, Myron was excited to learn that a film company was interested in an adaptation, with Meryl Streep proposed to play her. The first option was due to expire in June 2012; as of May a final script had not been approved. In 2012, Myron said that she had been unhappy with the script and was not sorry that version would not be filmed.

Myron and Witter published a children's picture book, Dewey: The Library Cat, in 2009, and also a book adaptation for middle-grade readers later that year.

In 2010, Myron and Witter published a sequel, Dewey's Nine Lives, recounting additional stories about Dewey. In addition, she discussed material from letters she received about people and their cats. That same year, she and Witter published a children's picture book, the second about the cat, called Dewey's Christmas at the Library and intended for 3–6-year olds.

Selected works

Honors
In 2012 Myron won the Iowa Association of School Librarians' Goldfinch Award for Dewey: There's a Cat in the Library,. This book was ranked first by Florida's children in 2011, and it was "in the running for a similar award in Nebraska." It is one of two picture books devoted to the cat.

See also
 Dewey Readmore Books

References

External links
 Official website

American women writers
Writers from Iowa
Living people
1947 births
People from Spencer, Iowa
People from O'Brien County, Iowa
People from Mankato, Minnesota
Emporia State University alumni
American librarians
American women librarians
21st-century American women
Minnesota State University, Mankato alumni